There are actually two Modern Ruthenian languages:

 Rusyn language, or Carpatho-Ruthenian, spoken in Carpathian Ruthenia
 Pannonian Rusyn language, or Pannonian-Ruthenian, spoken in Bačka and Syrmia, and an official language of Vojvodina